The 2018 RFL Women's Super League was the second season of the rugby league Women's Super League for female players in clubs affiliated to the Rugby Football League. The grand final was won by Wigan Warriors Women, who beat Leeds Rhinos Women 18–16 at the Grand Final at the Manchester Regional Arena.  Wigan finished second to League Leaders Shield winners Leeds in the regular season.

The defending champions were Bradford Bulls Women, but they failed to make the play-offs in 2018.

At the end of the regular season, the top four teams met in the play-off semi-finals. First placed Leeds beat fourth placed Castleford, while second placed Wigan beat St Helens who finished third. The winners met in the Grand Final at the Manchester Regional Arena on 13 October.

Teams
Two of the seven teams are newly formed for this season, one is renamed and the other four were in existence before 2018.

Fixtures and results
The fixtures are organised into 14 rounds, with each team only having 12 fixtures this means that every team will have a bye in two rounds of the competition.

Round 1

Bye:  Castleford Tigers

Round 2

Bye:  Wigan Warriors

Round 3

Bye:  York City Knights

Round 4

Bye:  Leeds Rhinos

Round 5

Bye:  Bradford Bulls

Round 6

Bye:  St Helens

Round 7

Bye:  Featherstone Rovers

Round 8

Bye:  Castleford Tigers

Round 9

Bye:  Wigan Warriors

Round 10

Bye:  York City Knights

Round 11

Bye:  Leeds Rhinos

Round 12

Bye:  Bradford Bulls

Round 13

Bye:  St Helens

Round 14

Bye:  Featherstone Rovers

Regular season standings

Play-offs

Semi-finals

Grand final

The Grand Final was played at the Manchester Regional Arena on 13 October 2018.  Neither team existed when the inaugural Grand Final was played in 2017.  Leeds were seeking to complete the treble (League Leaders Shield, Challenge Cup and Grand Final winners) in their first season while Wigan were seeking their first ever trophy.

Leeds scored first, when Rhiannion Marshall scored a try from close range, Courtney Hill added the conversion.  Wigan hit back a few minutes later when (Rachel Thompson scored their first try.  The first half remained 6–4 to Leeds until shortly before half-time, when Thompson scored her, and Wigan's second try to make the half-time score 8–6 to Wigan.

In the second half Georgia Wilson extended Wigan's lead to 12–6 and Thompson completed her hat trick to put Wigan further ahead 16–6.  Leeds struck back with a Caitlin Beevers solo effort, covering 80 metres from a 20-metre restart, Courtney Hill added the extra two points.  With the score at 12–16, Leeds equalised as Suze Hill scored with only three minutes left to play. The conversion attempt was missed, and in stoppage time, Wigan were awarded a penalty which Charlotte Foley kicked to give Wigan victory by 18 points to 16.

References

External links
WOMEN AND GIRLS RUGBY LEAGUE

RFL Women's Super League
2018 in English rugby league
2018 in English women's sport
2018 in women's rugby league